San Pedro (Misiones) is a village and municipality in Misiones Province in north-eastern Argentina.

The department contains the  Esmeralda Provincial Park, created in 1997.

References

Populated places in Misiones Province